Tina's Pals ("Turma da Tina") is a Brazilian comic strip series, part of the Monica's Gang series, created in 1970. The stories are aimed at a more teenage group of readers, rather than the kids who would read other Mauricio de Sousa's works and thus center around teenagers. However, Mauricio prefers not to mention drugs, sex, alcoholic drinks, or other similar subjects, which are very popular among teenagers. Instead, the strips are written with themes related to school or university, dating, problems with parents, etc.

Originally the stories recounted the life of Tina and her family living in Salvador, Flip (Toneco) was the original protagonist. The stories changed when Tina joined the hippie culture and started to act alongside Curly (Rolo). In the late of 1970s, Mauricio left the hippie style and started to work with a less particular way of life for them, making the characters become more modern and changing their personalities over the years.

Publication history 
During the year of 1970, during the debut of Monica's first comic book series Mauricio de Sousa decided to create a new comic strip series to replace the absence of his characters in the newspapers. In that same year several new characters were created, however the only characters that were kept were the boy Flip along their siblings Toim and Tina (that was a hippie kid in the first stories), his father and grandma, that later had their comics published also in the Monicas comic book starting at the 6th issue. After a few years Mauricio de Sousa began to be more interested in creating stories involving Tina, and later created their friends Curly (which was also another hippie character) and Puff in 1972, and the comics with Flip together family were becoming less frequent until get absent in the later comics.

At the end of the '70s the comics had gigantic changes in the art style and personalities of the characters: Tina and her friends become teenagers and have abandoned the hippie culture, Tina started to be drawn with more realistic and feminine features, and after the 80's appeared new characters like Puff's boyfriend: Steve (who eventually became a main character after a few years) and several other one-time characters. Since the '80s the comics have become one of the most popular franchises created by Mauricio de Sousa, continuing to have more modern stories and solding special titles and miniseries over the years.

 Characters 

 Main characters 
 Tina – A short form to say Cristina, Tina was introduced in 1970 as a hippie as young as Monica. During the eighties, she was redesigned as an older teenager with a more casual style. In the most recent stories she appears as a young adult. Tina is interested in fashion, music and beauty. She likes to dance and hang out with her friends. Among her pals, Tina is the least interested in dating.
 Curly (Rolo) – Curly was originally portrayed as a calm, easy-going hippie. His style was inspired by de Sousa's brother Márcio's own style. After the hippie attire was dismissed, women started to play the most frequent role of his strips. In most of these strips, he is flirting with any kind of girl who appears in his way, by any means necessary. Another passion of him is music. He plays the electric and acoustic guitar, sometimes alone, sometimes in a band.
 Puff (Pipa) – Tina's best friend, very cheerful, passionate, fat, and zaftig. But, above all those qualities, Puff is very jealous of her boyfriend Steve, which led to constant arguments between the couple. these arguments are a frequent subject for their strips. However, they always end together as strongly as before.
 Steve (Zecão) – Puff's boyfriend, suffer quite a lot with Puff's jealous of him. Like Curly, he enjoys music.

 Recurring 
 Flip (Toneco) – Tina's little brother. In the first stories was a 6-year-old kid, but recently he appears as a pre-teen whose exact age is unknown. He complains that Tina doesn't allow him to hang out with his friends or girls, since she thinks that he's not old and mature enough. This distinction causes them to have a common sibling rivalry, in which, in most of his appearances, they're usually arguing. He rarely appears in the comics, although he had originally been the main protagonist in the first stories.
 Granny (Vovoca) – Tina's grandmother. With a calm and loving personality, she's always seen to have a good relationship with her granddaughter, in which she's always helping and giving her advice for dealing life issues.
 Tina's Dad – A very nervous and busy father. Always he is punishing his daughter for her actions, and often shows jealous about the guys that Tina dating. In the early stories was a widowed man, but his wife had recently revealed.
 Tina's Mom - She is a bit like her daughter, she is often at home and like Granny, she tends to help Tina with some advice. It was introduced in the 2000s.
 Curly's Parents - They were introduced in the late 90's. Curly is seen living with them, having a good relationship with them. The father has similarities with the son, while the mother is shown to be very kind to Curly.
 Toim - Tina and Flip's younger brother. He is characterized by being a pessimistic boy who often cries easily. He is usually seen as a supporting character for Flip. He only appeared in older comics and was removed around 1973. However in a more recent comic he had an appearance in one of the stories as a friend of Flip.
 Palestrino – Tina's family pet parrot. He was introduced in 1970 in a story starring Flip where he ends up being mistakenly bought by Flip. He is described as a mischievous foul-mouthed parrot sometimes arrogant and troublesome. For a while he became popular enough to star in his own strips in Folha de S. Paulo, however the character was discontinued in 1973. In current comics he has rare appearances, most of the time being remembered in crossovers with the other forgotten old characters of Mauricio de Sousa, and rarely is he seen being associated with Tina and her family. His name is a tribute to the old football team Palestra Itália, currently known as Palmeiras.
 Gargarejo and Porcãozinho - A pair of dogs that were recurring in early strips. Gargarejo was Tina's family pet dog, often characterized by his mania for howling, while Porcãozinho was Gargarejo's best friend and sidekick. Like Palestrino, they were introduced in 1970 for the children's supplement of the newspaper Folha de S. Paulo, having been discontinued in 1973.
 José Francisco and Lúcia - A pair of siblings with no relation to Tina's family. José Francisco is a baby while Lúcia is his older sister. Like Palestrino, Gargarejo and Porcãozinho, they were introduced in 1970 for the children's supplement of the newspaper Folha de S. Paulo, having been discontinued in 1973.
 Jaime – He was the Tina's first boyfriend. He first appeared in the early of 80s, but after a few stories the romance between the two characters was over. Since then he went on to appear as one of several recurring ex-boyfriends Tina in stories. He owns a motorcycle.
 Rúbia – Tina's rival, which first appeared in the miniseries "Tina e os Caçadores de Enigmas". Blonde, rich and envious, she has a personality similar to Carmem from Monica's Gang. She is constantly seen with Jaime, but as Tina the dating of the two was broken with the time.
 Baixinho (literally "Shorty") – Curly's best friend. As the name suggests (Baixinho is a slang for a short person), Baixinho is not a tall guy, at all. Although it is Curly who have to save him from the troubles he get himself involved to, he is frequently giving advice for Curly, specially when he is doing one of his many attempts to date a girl.
 Vanda and Valéria''' – A pair of twin sisters, very similar. They were based on Mauricio de Sousa's daughters.

 Media 

In 1971 a song to Tina (based on her hippie version) was composed for the album "A Bandinha da Turma da Mônica", in 1987 another song for Tina was composed for the album "Turma da Mônica", entitled Tina Torna Tudo Legal (lit. Tina Makes It All Cool).

In 1979 there were plans for a live-action series starring the characters made in partnership with TV Cultura, and having as actors Beth Caruso as Tina, Vick Militello as Puff, and Kadu Moliterno as Curly, however the project was canceled before there was any filming.

The series had some special comic books (as part of the series Gibizinho) in the '90s by Editora Globo, four starring Tina, four starring Curly and one starring Puff.

In 2007 was published by Panini Comics a science-fiction miniseries starring Tina and her friends entitled "Tina e os Caçadores de Enigmas" (lit. Tina and the Enigma Hunters). The miniseries lasted with 3 issues, and subsequently had two sequels in 2008, in the same year was published a special comic entitled "Tina Especial". In May 2009 the series received its own comic book series entitled Tina, which ran until October 2011 with a total of 30 issues. After the cancellation, in 2014 was released a new version of the comic book featuring a new art style and new characters, but the changes have received a negative reception that resulted in the cancellation in 2015. The series also has an almanac with classic stories, the first series was published between 2004 and 2006 by Globo, currently the almanacs are published by Panini Comics since 2007.

Curly also makes a cameo in the Monica's Gang's 2007 animated film: Uma Aventura no Tempo.

In 2019 a graphical novel produced by Fefê Torquato based on Tina titled: Tina - Respeito'', was released as part of the Graphic MSP.

References

External links 
Official Monica's Gang website 
Official Monica's Gang website 

Monica's Gang
Teen comedy comics
Child characters in comics
Humor comics
Fictional Brazilian people
1970 comics debuts
Comics characters introduced in 1970
Comics adapted into animated series
Brazilian comics titles
Comics about women
Hippie movement